Hanoar Hatzioni (lit. The Zionist Youth), fully "Histadrut Halutzit Olamit Hanoar Hatzioni", or "HH" for short, is a youth movement established in 1926, with its head offices now in Israel. Its three main pillars are Chalutzism ("pioneering spirit", from the Hebrew word chalutz, "pioneer"), Pluralism, and Zionism. The movement sees Judaism as the source of national, social and moral values that preserve the integrity and continuity of the Jewish people.

The main objective of the HaNoar Hatzioni is Hagshama Atzmit (personal materialization), which among other things means to have a full Jewish life in Israel. For its purposes the movement uses the scout method.

History of Hanoar
During the years following the First World War, two ideological currents ran throughout European youth, Jews included: fascist nationalism and revolutionary Marxism. A small group of enlightened Jewish youths criticised the extremist positions and slogans and concluded that they would not endure reality. At the same time, they sensed the danger caused by the separation and division of people into two opposing camps, fighting each other. They then considered an obligation to create a youth movement.

The year was 1926 when the idea crystallized with the establishment of Hanoar Hatzioni. Already at its beginnings, the movement appeared on the scene as an educational movement extracting its principles at the foundations of Judaism, Zionism and pioneering.

History of Hanoar in Britain
In 1956, Hanoar Hatzioni was established in Britain. During this time, there was little on offer to Jewish youth. Hanoar Hatzioni offered an alternative to the highly political or religiously affiliated Zionist youth movements, and the non-political youth clubs.

During the 1960s, Hanoar Hatzioni in Britain focused its activities in those parts which had very little to offer Jewish youth. Hanoar Hatzioni successfully ran weekly meetings all around the country, residential events such as camps that are continued to this day, and trips to Israel.

The Hanoar Hatzioni Vision
Hanoar has two underlying beliefs: (a) educating the Chanich (participant); and (b) a Jewish-Zionist worldview.  Through this it strives to grow the future of the Jewish people with a belief in the centrality of the State of Israel.

Judaism
Since the times of the Second Temple, Judaism was very heavily engaged in argument and debate – this is what led to the writing of the Talmud.  This has continued and Hanoar Hatzioni both accepts and encourages the existence of different streams of thought, philosophical conceptions and ways of practice, within the framework of the modern Jewish spectrum.

Also Hanoar Hatzioni accepts anyone who defines themselves as Jewish, beyond Orthodox Halacha requirements.  It strives to create Chanichim with a strong identity of who participants are and what it means to be Jewish.

Zionism
Their belief is that Zionism can and will bring together the dispersed nation in its historical homeland and that only in Israel can there be a full, normative and Jewish experience for an entire society.

The movement also recognises that there are many different conceptions of Zionism and values them all.  However it also recognises the need to rank these different interpretations, with Israel being at the centre.  Therefore, Aliyah is the highest expression of Judaism and Zionism and something all graduates (bogrim, singular boger/et) need to place before themselves as part of their self-realisation.

Hagshama
This is one of the central pillars of Hanoar Hatzioni and something that all participants must go through in their time in the movement.  In the modern world this means finding the meeting point between personal interests and the needs of the nation. In Jewish history, before the creation of the State it was Kibbutzim that fulfilled these ideals – bringing justice and equality to the front as individuals would work together for the greater good of the collective.  Hanoar Hatzioni hope that the renewed evaluation of the Kibbutz ideals will once again see these institutions at the front of society.

Dugma Ishit
The Madrich is the foundation of its educational programme and the personal example of our Madrichim and Bogrim awards the ethical basis for its work. 
As a result of this, HHUK directs the majority of its efforts towards content and ideals, with its heritage, Chanichim and Bogrim, representing a serious and responsible movement committed to Jewish-Zionist informal education.

Worldwide movement
Hanoar Hatzioni is currently located in 17 countries across four different continents, making for a truly global youth movement.  Hanoar Hatzioni is active in England, Belgium, Greece, Hungary, Spain, Canada, Mexico, Costa Rica, Ecuador, Colombia, Peru, Chile, Brazil, Paraguay, Uruguay, and Argentina.

Participants and movement leaders (madrichim, singular madrich/a; literally guides) from all the different countries have opportunities to meet each other and interact on a variety of events, be it during Israel Tour, Gap Year, other trips to Israel as well as an annual international "Seminar for Madrichim and Bogrim" (SBM) which in 2010 was hosted in London, 2011 in Antwerp, 2012 in Budapest and 2013 in Athens.

Britain
Hanoar Hatzioni in Britain is a youth movement that works with leaders and participants wherever they may be.  A range of activities are provided for at youth centres in Southend, King Solomon High School, Kulanu (Kenton), Rowley Lane and Shenley., the Zone in Leeds and the Hub in Manchester

In addition to regular activities, Hanoar Hatzioni UK offers an annual summer camp, Israel Tour and Gap Year Programmes.  During the summer camps the participants are exposed to some of the most creative and spontaneous leaders around, they even have time to show off their vocal skills in their camp album.

Hanoar Hatzioni offers its members a membership scheme which means that they are kept up to date with activities as well as a discount on events that they want to attend It is a scheme that gives both the children and leaders something.

Many members have gone on to do great things both for their communities back at home, as well as those in Israel.  Spencer Gelding, formally the Mazkir (National Director) of Hanoar Hatzioni in Britain, has given his time to many charitable causes.

Settlements of Hanoar Hatzioni

Kibbutzim

Usha
HaSolelim
Kfar Glickson
Tel Yitzhak
Nitzanim 
Ein HaShlosha

Moshavim

Sde David
Petahya
Yad Natan
Timorim
Nir Yisrael
Shoresh
Givat Yeshayahu
Talmei Yaffe
Mavki'im
Kfar Shmuel
Shilat
Beit Nehemia
Beit Yehoshua
Reihan
Mei Ami
Alonei Abba
Neot Golan
She'ar Yashuv
Dishon
Amnun
Sde Eliezer
Massua

References

External links
HaNoar HaTzioni Official website

Zionist youth movements
Youth organizations based in Israel
Non-aligned Scouting organizations
General Zionism
Youth organizations established in 1926